Spišský Hrhov is a municipality and village in the Spiš region of Slovakia, between Levoča and Spišské Podhradie in Levoča District. It has a population of 1800, of which 350 are Roma, well integrated in the local community.

History
The region contains Neolithic remains, but the earliest written reference to Spišský Hrhov dates from 1243. Originally there were two neighbouring villages named Hrhov, one Slovak and one German. The village became the property of the Čáki (Csáky) family in the 19th century, and their Neo-Baroque manor house still exists (currently abandoned). German village had been known under the name Gorgau.

The village, which is renowned for its crafts, contains the picturesque Early Gothic church of St. Simon and St. Jude. There is also a substantial medieval stone bridge, one of the few survivors of its type.

Geography
The municipality lies at an elevation of 475 metres and covers an area of 12.222 km².

Famous people
Gyula Tornai (1861–1928), Hungarian painter was born here at the time when Görgő was a town of the Kingdom of Hungary

References

External links
 Spišský Hrhov official website
 http://spisskyhrhov.e-obce.sk

Spiš
Villages and municipalities in Levoča District